Coprosma laevigata, the Rarotongan coprosma, is a herbaceous plant, a member of the Rubiaceae family.

Distribution 
It is an endemic species to the Cook Islands.

Taxonomy 
It was named by Thomas Cheeseman, in Trans. Linn. Soc. London, Bot. 6: 283, in 1903.

References

External links 

 Coprosma laevigata Cheeseman on Digital Public Library of America

laevigata
Endemic flora of the Cook Islands
Taxa named by Thomas Frederic Cheeseman